Max Straubinger (born 12 August 1954) is a German politician of the Christian Social Union in Bavaria (CSU) who has been serving as a member of the Bundestag from the state of Bavaria since 1994.

Political career
Straubinger first became member of the bundestag after the 1994 German federal election. He is a member of the Committee for Labour and Social Affairs and the Committee for Food and Agriculture.

In 2014, Straubinger co-chaired the CSU’s convention in Munich.

References

External links 

  
 Bundestag biography 

1954 births
Living people
Members of the Bundestag for Bavaria
Members of the Bundestag 2021–2025
Members of the Bundestag 2017–2021
Members of the Bundestag 2013–2017
Members of the Bundestag 2009–2013
Members of the Bundestag 2005–2009
Members of the Bundestag 2002–2005
Members of the Bundestag 1998–2002
Members of the Bundestag 1994–1998
People from Dingolfing-Landau
Members of the Bundestag for the Christian Social Union in Bavaria